Cathedra serrata is a species of planthopper in the monotypic genus Cathedra, recorded from Ecuador and Suriname; the Catalogue of Life does not list any subspecies.

References

External links

Fulgorinae